German submarine U-2509 was a Type XXI U-boat (one of the "Elektroboote") of Nazi Germany's Kriegsmarine, built for service in World War II. She was ordered on 6 November 1943, and was laid down on 17 June 1944 at the Blohm & Voss yard at Hamburg, as yard number 2509. She was launched on 27 August 1944, and commissioned under the command of Kapitänleutnant Rudolf Schendel on 21 September 1944.

Design
Like all Type XXI U-boats, U-2509 had a displacement of  when at the surface and  while submerged. The submarine was powered by two MAN SE supercharged six-cylinder M6V40/46KBB diesel engines each providing , two Siemens-Schuckert GU365/30 double-acting electric motors each providing , and two Siemens-Schuckert silent running GV232/28 electric motors each providing .

U-2509 was fitted with six  torpedo tubes in the bow and four  C/30 anti-aircraft guns. She could carry twenty-three torpedoes or seventeen torpedoes and twelve mines. The complement was five officers and fifty-two men.

Fate
U-2509 was sunk on 8 April 1945, by bombs, in the Blohm & Voss shipyard in Hamburg. U-2509 was caught in an RAF Bomber Command raid made up of Lancaster and Halifax bombers.

References

Bibliography

External links
 

Type XXI submarines
U-boats commissioned in 1944
U-boats sunk in 1945
World War II submarines of Germany
1944 ships
Ships built in Hamburg
Maritime incidents in April 1945